"L'odeur de l'essence" is a song by French rapper Orelsan, released on 17 November 2021, through 7th Magnitude, 3ème Bureau and Wagram Music, as the lead single from his fourth studio album, Civilisation (2021). It is his first release as lead artist in nearly four years. Music critics acclaimed the song lyrics, while Interlude described it as an explosive and triumphant return for the rapper.

Charts

References

2021 singles
2021 songs
French-language songs
Number-one singles in France
Orelsan songs
Songs written by Skread
Songs written by Orelsan